The 1997 London Broncos season was the eighteenth in the club's history and their second season in the Super League. Coached by Tony Currie, the Broncos competed in Super League II and finished in 2nd place. The club also reached the fifth round of the 1997 Challenge Cup and the Quarter Finals in the 1997 World Club Championship.

1997 squad statistics

Sources: Super League II 1997World Club Challenge 1997 - Squads - London Broncos

Super League II table

Source:

1997 Challenge Cup
The London Broncos progressed to the fifth round of the Cup, before losing to the Bradford Bulls at The Stoop.

1997 World Club Championship

Super League
Pool A

Sources:

WCC matches

Round 1

Round 2

Round 3

Round 4

Round 5

Round 6

Quarter-finals

Sources:

References

External links
London Broncos - Rugby League Project

London Broncos seasons
London Broncos